Bella (25 March 1899 – 27 April 1990) and Samuel Spewack (16 September 1899 – 14 October 1971) were a husband-and-wife writing team.

Samuel, who also directed many of their plays, was born in Ukraine. He attended Stuyvesant High School in New York City and then received his degree from Columbia College.

Lives and careers
The oldest of three children of a single mother, Bella Cohen was born in Bucharest, Romania and with her family emigrated to the Lower East Side of Manhattan when she was a child. After graduation from Washington Irving High School, she worked as a journalist for socialist and pacifist newspapers such as the New York Call. Her work drew attention from Samuel, working as a reporter for The World, and the couple married in 1922. Shortly afterwards, they departed for Moscow, where they worked as news correspondents for the next four years.

After returning to the United States, they settled in New Hope, Pennsylvania. In the latter part of the decade, Samuel wrote several novels, including Mon Paul, The Skyscraper Murder, and The Murder in the Gilded Cage, on his own, while the pair collaborated on plays. The two wrote several plays and screenplays for mostly B-movies throughout the 1930s, earning an Academy Award nomination for Best Original Story for My Favorite Wife in 1940. They also penned a remake of Grand Hotel, entitled Week-End at the Waldorf (1945), which starred Ginger Rogers.

Always known as a turbulent couple, the Spewaks were in the midst of their own marital woes in 1948 when they were approached to write the book for Kiss Me, Kate, which centered on a once-married couple of thespians who use the stage on which they're performing as a battling ground. Bella initially began working with composer Cole Porter on her own, but theatrical necessity overcame marital sparks, and the Spewacks completed the project together. It yielded each of them two Tony Awards, one for Best Musical, the other for Best Author of a Musical. Kiss Me, Kate proved to be their most successful work.

In 1965, Sam collaborated with Frank Loesser on a musical adaptation of the 1961 Spewack play Once There Was a Russian. Entitled Pleasures and Palaces, it closed following its Detroit run and never opened on Broadway.

Bella was a successful publicist for the Camp Fire Girls and Girl Scouts of the USA, and claimed to have introduced the idea of selling cookies for the latter as a means of raising revenue for the organization.

A Letter to Sam from Bella, a one-act play by Broadway director Aaron Frankel, is based on the Spewacks' personal papers from the Theater Arts Collection of Columbia University's Rare Book and Manuscript Library.

Their best known straight play was My Three Angels, which is still sometimes performed, and was adapted as the film We're No Angels.

Additional Broadway credits
The War Song, 1928
Poppa, 1928
Clear All Wires, 1932
Spring Song, 1934
Boy Meets Girl, 1935
Leave It to Me!, 1938
Miss Swan Expects, 1939
Woman Bites Dog, 1946
Two Blind Mice, 1949
The Golden State, 1950
My Three Angels, 1953
Festival, 1955
Once There Was a Russian, 1961

References

External links

Finding aid to Bella and Samuel Spewack papers at Columbia University 

20th-century American dramatists and playwrights
20th-century American male writers
20th-century American musicians
20th-century American novelists
American male non-fiction writers
Columbia College (New York) alumni
Jewish American songwriters
Married couples
Novelists from New York (state)
People from the Lower East Side
Tony Award winners
Washington Irving High School (New York City) alumni
Writers from Pennsylvania